CAB is the self-titled first studio album by the band CAB, released on March 7, 2000 through Tone Center Records.

Track listing

Personnel
Tony MacAlpine – guitar, keyboard
Bunny Brunel – keyboard, bass, engineering, mixing, production
Dennis Chambers – drums
Brian Auger – organ
Barry Rudolph – engineering, mixing
Dallan Beck – engineering

References

External links
In Review: MacAlpine/Brunel/Chambers "Cab" at Guitar Nine Records

CAB (band) albums
2000 debut albums
Tone Center Records albums